Mogilno  is a village in the administrative district of Gmina Korzenna, within Nowy Sącz County, Lesser Poland Voivodeship, in southern Poland.

The village has a population of 1,301.

References

Mogilno